Radical Rex is an action platforming video game released in 1994 in North America, Europe and Australia. It is a remake of the 1993 Game Boy game Baby T-Rex. It was published by Activision and developed by Australian game studio Beam Software for the Super NES, Genesis, and Sega CD. A Microsoft Windows port of the Super NES version published by Piko Interactive was released on March 7, 2019. Piko also released the game as part of the Piko Interactive Collection 1 for the Evercade on June 8, 2020.

Gameplay
The game stars Radical Rex, a skateboarding, fire-breathing Tyrannosaurus rex who must save his land, and his girlfriend Rexanne, from an evil magician named Sethron. In his way are dinosaurs, sea creatures, and other monsters.

Rex has a few abilities, including a roar that kills or hurts all enemies on screen, a fire breath which can temporarily immobilize enemies, and a bubble spray which he can use while underwater. Sethron is replaced by a weasel-like mammal named Skriitch in the Mega Drive/Genesis and Sega CD versions. Despite this, the weasel acts the same as its Super NES Counterpart.

Reception

The game has received mixed to negative reviews.

Reviewing the Super NES version, GamePros Bonehead complained that the music becomes repetitive and the player character's skateboard "goes so fast you often miss power-ups and jumps", but praised the cutesy and humorous graphics and the simple enjoyability of the gameplay, and summarized the game as "about as good and as endearing as the successful Joe and Mac games." A reviewer for Next Generation, on the other hand, gave it a thoroughly negative assessment. He criticized the incongruity between the cheerful, goofy player character and the murky background graphics, and said that though he agreed the gameplay is often reminiscent of Joe and Mac, "it is consistently flat, unmotivating and not up to par with other platform games."

GamePro stated that the Genesis version has slightly less colorful graphics and more muffled sound effects than the Super NES version, and is missing the entertaining intro rap, but that it retains all the essential elements that made the game fun. They concluded that it would appeal to younger gamers but is too easy and cutesy for older gamers. They remarked of the Sega CD version, "Although some of the levels and enemies are new, the CD graphics and sounds are virtually identical to those on the SNES and Genesis." The four reviewers of Electronic Gaming Monthly were more critical, saying the game had nothing but its CD quality soundtrack to justify its presence on the Sega CD. They also criticized the lack of polish in the gameplay and controls.

Sega-16 gave the Mega-CD version a 4.0 out of 10.0 as it was criticized for utilizing the "extreme bad attitude" fad that was being popular through pop culture throughout the 1990s, that the game has offered and also claimed to have a lack of originality. It was also criticized for having repetitive straightforward platforming elements within its gameplay and graphics, cheap obstacles and frustratingly difficult bosses.

References

External links

1994 video games
Activision games
Dinosaurs in video games
Piko Interactive games
Platform games
Sega Genesis games
Sega CD games
Side-scrolling video games
Skateboarding video games
Super Nintendo Entertainment System games
Video games developed in Australia
Video games set in prehistory
Multiplayer and single-player video games
Windows games